Trigraph may refer to:

Computing
 Digraphs and trigraphs, a group of characters used to symbolise one character
An octal or decimal representation of byte values
Mnemonics for machine language instructions
As language codes in ISO 639

Cryptography
As substitution group in a substitution cipher
As combinations in the Ling Qi Jing

Mathematics
As a generalization of graphs where there is a set of edges called semi-adjacent

Other uses
Trigraph (orthography), a sound representation in orthography

See also
Digraph (disambiguation)
Tetragraph
Multigraph (disambiguation)